Zay (also Lak'i, Laqi) is an Afroasiatic language of the Semitic branch spoken in Ethiopia. It is one of the Gurage languages in the Ethiopian Semitic group. The Zay language has around 5,000 speakers known as the Zay, who inhabit Gelila and the other five islands and shores of Lake Zway in the southern part of the country.

Language situation

Zay is an unwritten language.  Most speakers are multilingual in other Gurage languages, in the Oromo language, and in Amharic. The language is geographically concentrated around Lake Zway; specifically, in Herera, Meki, Ziway, and the five islands: Fundurro Island (Famat or Getesemani Island) the smallest island; Tsedecha Island (Aysut Island), next to the biggest island; Debre-Tsion Island, the largest island; Gelila Island; and Debre Sina Island. It is an endangered language, with speakers migrating to the mainland adopting the Oromo language, and increasing use of Oromo by the younger generations on the Zay islands.

Zay is 70% lexically similar with the Siltʼe language, and 60% with Harari.

Grammar
The word order of Zay is SOV (subject–object–verb). Attributive adjectives precede the nouns they modify. Possessives also precede nouns. Zay is a  pro-drop language, with required subject-marking on the verb.

Zay has been greatly affected by contact it has had with the Gurage languages. This contact has created a significant amount of lexical and grammatical change in Zay.

References

Further reading
Demeke, Grima A., & Meyer, Ronny. "Contact-induced language change in selected Ethiopian Semitic Languages."
Demissie, Ambaw (1990), The phonology of Zay: A generative approach. M.A. thesis. Addis Ababa University.
Gardner, Simon. and Siebert, Ralph. (2001), "Sociolinguistic Survey Report of the Zay Language Area", SIL Electronic Survey Reports 2002-024:12. 
Hetzron, Robert (1972), "Ethiopian Semitic: studies in classification (No. 2)". Manchester University Press.
Jordan, Linda; Netzley, Jillian; & Mohammed, Hussein (2011). "A Sociolinguistic Survey Report of the Zay People in Ethiopia". SIL Electronic Survey Reports 2011-046: 43, 2011-046.
 Meyer, Ronny (2005), Das Zay: Deskriptive Grammatik einer Ostguragesprache (Äthiosemitisch). Grammatical Analyses of African Languages, vol. 25. Köln: Rüdiger Köppe. .
Meyer, Ronny. (2002), "Language Change in a Multilingual Society: The Influence of Oromo on the Lexicon of Zay". Institute of Language Studies, Addis Ababa University.
Meyer, Ronny (2002), "‘To be or not to be’ – Is there a present tense copula in Zay?" in: Baye Yimam, R. Pankhurst, D. Chapple, Yonas Admasu, A. Pankhurst, Birhanu Teferra (Hg.), Proceedings of the 14th International Conference of Ethiopian Studies, 6–11 November 2000, Addis Ababa. Addis Ababa 2002, 1798–1808
Shikur, Getu (1999), Morphology of Zay. M.A. thesis. Addis Ababa University.
Vinson, Michael A. (2012), "The struggle for recognition: a critical ethnographic study of the Zay." African Studies Center, Universiteit Leiden. 
 Wolf Leslau (1999), Zway Ethiopic Documents. Aethiopische Forschungen, Band 51. Wiesbaden: Harrassowitz. .

External links
Endangered Languages profile for Zay
Audio recordings of Zay

Transverse Ethiopian Semitic languages
Languages of Ethiopia
Subject–object–verb languages
Endangered languages of Africa
Severely endangered languages